The 1999–2000 season was Stoke City's 93rd season in the Football League and sixth in the third tier.

For the third pre-season Stoke were looking for a new manager but the directors were finding it difficult with first choice Tony Pulis joining Bristol City openly admitting that he felt the board lacked ambition. Second choice was Gary Megson and he accepted the job offer as did John Rudge who became director of football. Stoke slowly built up some decent results but there were still tensions between fans and the board and so when news spread that an Icelandic business consortium wanted to take over it became a no-brainer. Unfortunately for Megson new chairman Gunnar Gíslason appointed his own man, former Iceland national manager Gudjon Thordarson. In came a number of Icelandic players and the side did well winning the Football League Trophy and reached the play-offs against Gillingham. After beating the "Gills" 3–2 in the first leg, two controversial refereeing decisions cost Stoke dearly and they lost the second leg 3–0.

Season review

League
For the third consecutive summer, Stoke were hunting for a new manager, this time they had a clear favourite, Tony Pulis. However Pulis decided to join Bristol City after openly admitting that he felt the board lacked ambition. Second choice was Gary Megson, hard working and honest manager in the same mould as Pulis and he accepted Stoke's job offer. He appointed Nigel Pearson as his assistant and surprisingly John Rudge was made director of football after spending a long time at Port Vale. There was little expectation as the season began with some steady if unspectacular results and by the end of August Lárus Sigurðsson was sold to West Bromwich Albion for £350,000. Peter Thorne was proving to be a top player in the Second Division he scored the first few of his 30 goals. Stoke then went on a nine match unbeaten run and lifted themselves into the play-offs. In October news spread that a group of Icelandic businessmen were interested in taking control of the club and by mid November Stoke fans had their wishes granted and Gunnar Gíslason completed the Icelandic takeover under the name of Stoke Holding.

Gary Megson through no fault of his own was replaced by Gudjon Thordarson and in came a number of Icelandic players and the new era began well with Stoke beating Wycombe Wanderers 4–0 away. There was now a much better feeling about the club with the injection of new money and players but this was knocked back greatly in early 2000. On 23 February 2000 arguably one of the greatest footballers the world has ever seen Stanley Matthews died at the age of 85. Matthews was not just a club legend but also to Stoke-on-Trent as a whole. He was remembered in a perfect way with Stoke beating Chesterfield 5–1 with Thorne scoring four goals.

Stoke maintained their form from this match and went unbeaten until the final match of the season but despite a 1–0 defeat at Reading Stoke finished two points above Bristol Rovers and entered the play-offs. Their opponents were Gillingham and in the first leg 22,124 saw Stoke make a great start going into a 2–0 lead thanks to Arnar Gunnlaugsson and Kyle Lightbourne Gillingham pulled one back but Thorne restored Stoke's two goal advantage. Andy Hessenthaler then scored in injury time meaning the second leg would be a very tough match. In the second leg at Priestfield Stadium referee Rob Styles sent off both Graham Kavanagh and Clive Clarke for minor offences and Gillingham went on to win 3–0.

FA Cup
Another early exit for Stoke this season, defeated 2–0 away at Blackpool.

League Cup
After beating last seasons opponents Macclesfield Town Stoke lost 3–1 to Premier League Sheffield Wednesday.

League Trophy
Stoke began their Football League Trophy campaign on a cold December night against Third Division Darlington at the Britannia Stadium. With the scores level after normal time Kyle Lightbourne scored a golden goal to send Stoke through. Away wins over Oldham Athletic, Blackpool and Chesterfield saw Stoke in the area final against Rochdale. A 3–1 win in the first leg was followed by a 1–0 win in the second earning a place in the final against Bristol City. A crowd of 75,057 at Wembley saw Graham Kavanagh opened the scoring for Stoke before Paul Holland equalised for the Robins. Peter Thorne scored a close range winner for Stoke after 82 minutes earning Stoke their second Football League Trophy win.

Final league table

Results
Stoke's score comes first

Legend

Pre-Season Friendlies

Football League Second Division

Second Division play-offs

FA Cup

League Cup

League Trophy

Squad statistics

References

Stoke City F.C. seasons
Stoke City